Plassanal is a very small town in Kottayam district, state of Kerala, India. It is 4 km northwest of the town of Erattupetta.

Places of interest
 Discs and Machines - Sunny's Gramophone Museum and Records Archive: a private museum of gramophone players and a large collection of mainly 78 rpm disc records.

Education
 St. Antony's Higher Secondary School
 Government Lower Primary School
 Plassanal Nursery School

Hospitals
 Holy Family Hospital

Religious places
 St. Mary's Church
 Incholikkavu Temple
 Carmelite Convent

Accessibility: Nearest cities and towns 

Nearest Airport - Cochin International Airport

Nearest Railway Station- Kottayam railway station

Distance to Cochin   - 80 km

Distance to Kottayam - 37 km

Distance to Pala - 9 km

Distance to Bharananganam - 4 km

References

Villages in Kottayam district